The Appalachian Brewing Company, commonly known as ABC, is an American brewery in Harrisburg, Pennsylvania. It was founded in January 1997. Appalachian also operates pubs in Gettysburg, Lititz, Mechanicsburg and Shippensburg. The logo features the Rockville Bridge, which crosses the Susquehanna river just north of Harrisburg.

Craft beer

Flagship brews 
 Aero-Head Bock
 Trail Blaze Maple Brown Ale
 Chocolate Avenue Stout
 Outta Focus Double IPA
 Water Gap Wheat Ale
 Mountain Lager Dortmunder Export
 Hoppy Trails India Pale Ale
 Jolly Scot Scottish Style Ale

Seasonal specialty brews 
 Zoigl Star Lager Unfiltered Lager
 Celtic Knot Irish Red Ale
 Anniversary Maibock
 Mad Cameron Belgian Wit
 Hinterland Hefe Weizen
 Volks Weizenbock
 Kipona Fest Marzen
 Fresh Hop Pale Ale
 Rutty Buck Pumpkin Ale
 Batch No. 666 Halloween Beer
 Grinnin' Grizzly Holiday Spiced Ale
 Pennypacker Porter

Craft soda
Craft sodas include:
 Appalachian Root Beer
 Diet Appalachian Root Beer
 Appalachian White Birch Beer
 Appalachian Ginger Beer

See also 
 List of food companies

References

External links
Company website

Companies based in Harrisburg, Pennsylvania
Beer brewing companies based in Pennsylvania
American soft drinks